Very Be Careful (VBC) is a Los Angeles band that plays Colombian vallenato music, a traditional cumbia sound that centers around the accordion, backed with percussion and bass.  
The group was started in 1998 in Los Angeles by accordionist Ricardo"Ricky G" Guzman and his bass playing brother Arturo "Brickems" Guzman. They were soon joined by Richard "Mil Caras" Panta on Caja Vallenata, Craig "Peabody" Martín on Guacharaca and Dante "The Rip" Ruiz on Cowbell.

They have independently released 7 full-length studio albums mixed with equal parts traditional covers and original material. They have also toured to Japan playing one of the largest festivals there with over 100,000 people attending in 2005, The Fuji Rock Festival as well as one of London's largest, The Glastonbury Festival. In 2006, Very Be Careful completed a European tour.

Discography

References

External links
Very Be Careful
VBC on kcet.org
Very Be Careful, "Escape Room" on Billboard
Very Be Careful interview on Latino USA
Los Angeles' Very Be Careful on continuing Colombia's Vallenato tradition (Sounds and Colours)

Musical groups from Los Angeles